Hilda Mary Hooke (after marriage, Smith; 3 October 1898 – 1978) was an English-born Canadian writer of dramas, poetry, and prose. Her 1938 play, Here Will I Nest was adapted into Canada's first colour feature-length motion picture, Talbot of Canada, for which she wrote the screenplay. Hooke died in 1978.

Biography
Hilda Mary Hooke was born at Odcombe, Somerset, England, 3 October 1898. Her parents were Oswald Edgar Smith and Louisa Elizth (Tapscott) Smith. She came to Canada in 1902.  

For some years after her arrival, she was engaged in musical and dramatic work. Hooke was affiliated with the Little Theatre in London, Ontario, since the 1920s as producer, director, and playwright. Here Will I Nest, first performed in 1938, became the first Canadian play to be adapted into a motion picture. She wrote three plays around the central figure of Lord Talbot and another three centered on Dr. John Troyer. 

Later in her writing career, she became a poet. She also wrote a book about folklore (Thunder in the Mountains: Legends of Canada).

While serving as secretary to the Chief Inspector of Public Schools, London, Ontario, she published less. In 1946, she also served as secretary to Canon Quintin Warner.

On 26 September 1925, she married Richard Tapscott Smith. She died in Comox, British Columbia, 1978.

Selected works

Plays
 Here Will I Nest, 1938
 A Time of Grace: A Play in Three Acts, 1941
 One-Act Plays from Canadian History, 1942
 The Streamlined Madonna, 1946
 Legend, 1949

Screenplays
 Here Will I Nest (alt. Talbot of Canada), 1942

Prose
 Thunder in the Mountains: Legends of Canada'', 1947

Song lyrics
 "The challenger. A part song for mixed voices.", 1919 (music by Peter C. Lutkin)

References

1898 births
1978 deaths
20th-century Canadian dramatists and playwrights
20th-century Canadian poets
20th-century Canadian women writers
People from Somerset
British emigrants to Canada
Canadian women dramatists and playwrights
Canadian women poets